Keith Frank Molesworth (October 20, 1905 – March 12, 1966) was an American football player and coach. He also played and managed in minor league baseball.

Early life
Molesworth was born in Washington, Iowa and graduated from Washington High School. Due to his size, he never started a prep football game. Molesworth started growing during the following year, never growing larger than 5′9″ and 167 lb.; however, this spurt started his career in sports.

College career
Molesworth went to Monmouth College located in Monmouth, Illinois, where he won three letters each in four varsity sports American football, basketball, baseball and track. He became one of the rare 12-letter performers in the history of Monmouth College. He was elected to the Monmouth College Athletic Hall of Fame in 1984. He graduated from Monmouth College in 1928.

Professional career
Molesworth played as a professional for nine years, the last seven in both baseball and football. Four of the baseball seasons were in Minor league baseball. Molesworth played football for the independent professional Ironton Tanks, who helped defeat the Chicago Bears in November 1930 and impressing George Halas in the process.  After the Ironton Tanks folded in 1931, he tried out for the Bears and went on to play seven seasons with the team, where he was the T-formation quarterback in a backfield that included Red Grange and Bronko Nagurski. The 1932 and 1933 Bears were National Football League champions. He was elected to the State of Iowa Athletic Hall of Fame in 1990.

Coaching career
Molesworth spent eight years as the backfield coach at the U.S. Naval Academy, then six more as a semipro football coach and one year doubling as a minor-league baseball manager, before becoming backfield coach for the Pittsburgh Steelers in 1952.

He was head coach of the Baltimore Colts in 1953, the first season of that franchise's existence. He remained with the club as a vice president and director of personnel until dying of a heart attack on March 12, 1966, while seeding his lawn, at the age of 60.

References

External links
 
 

1905 births
1966 deaths
American football halfbacks
American football quarterbacks
American men's basketball players
Baltimore Colts coaches
Baltimore Colts executives
Chicago Bears players
Monmouth College alumni
Monmouth Fighting Scots baseball players
Monmouth Fighting Scots football players
Monmouth Fighting Scots men's basketball players
Navy Midshipmen football coaches
Pittsburgh Steelers coaches
College men's track and field athletes in the United States
Minor league baseball managers
People from Washington, Iowa
Players of American football from Iowa
Baltimore Colts head coaches